Alif Haciyev Latif oglu (June 24, 1953 – February 26, 1992) was an Azerbaijani officer, Commandant of Khojaly Airport and National Hero of Azerbaijan.

Early years
Alif Hajiyev was born on June 24, 1953, in Khojaly.
From 1971 through 1973, Hajiyev served in Soviet Armed Forces and was stationed in Minsk, Belarus. In 1974–84, he held various positions in Ministry of Internal Affairs of Belorussian SSR and militia of NKAO of Azerbaijan SSR.
In December 1990, Alif Hajiyev was appointed head of administration and commandant of Khojaly airport. In December 1991, Hajiyev was promoted to a rank of major.

Khojaly Massacre

Alif Hajiyev helped the completely surrounded town survive for a few months with no gas and electricity, limited supply of food. When the Armenian offensive from three sides started on February 25, Alif gave an order to evacuate the town. The few defenders along with Hajiyev escorted the crowd of civilians along the Gorgor river valley overnight to the open plain near the village Nakhichevanli, just six miles away from Azerbaijani positions in Şelli village of Aghdam, where the Khojaly Massacre took place on February 26.

Death
Alif Hajiyev was one of the Azeri combatants escorting hundreds of Azerbaijani civilians fleeing Khojaly. While crossing a road in groups, civilians were defended by Hajiyev who exchanged fire with Armenian troops. While covering the third group, Hajiyev was shot dead while changing magazines. The bullet hit him in the head. Hajiyev was one of 40 defendants of the city which were stationed in Khojaly. Only 10 survived. more than 200 Azerbaijani were killed during these events. Hajiyev was buried in Martyrs' Lane, Baku.

Honors
He was survived by his wife, Gala Hajiyeva. He was posthumously awarded the title of the National Hero of Azerbaijan.

See also
 Khojaly Massacre
 First Nagorno-Karabakh War
 National Hero of Azerbaijan

References 

1953 births
1992 deaths
Azerbaijani military personnel
Azerbaijani military personnel of the Nagorno-Karabakh War
Azerbaijani military personnel killed in action
People from Khojali
National Heroes of Azerbaijan
Victims of the Khojaly massacre